Nuevo Santander (New Santander) was a region of the Viceroyalty of New Spain, covering the modern Mexican state of Tamaulipas and extending into modern-day southern Texas in the United States. A history of Texas, commissioned by the U.S. government's Federal Writers' Project in 1934, noted that "The borders of New Santander did not stop at the Rio Bravo" (the Mexican name for the Rio Grande); and added that the borders "went north to the Nueces, near Corpus Christi, then west and north to the Medina, then south again on a line along Laredo to the eastern slopes of the Sierra Madres, deep in Mexico."

Nuevo Santander was named after Santander, Cantabria, Spain, and settled by Spanish American colonists in a concerted settlement campaign peaking in 1748–1750. It fell under the jurisdiction of the Real Audiencia of Guadalajara in judicial matters, and in 1776 Nuevo Santander became part of the semi-autonomous Provincias Internas.

José de Escandón founded the colony in 1747. In 1755 Jiménez was founded which became the major town and capital of the colony. The state was subsequently renamed to Tamaulipas once Mexico gained its independence in 1821.

See also
Governors of Nuevo Santander
History of Mexico
History of Texas
Brownsville, Texas
Laredo, Texas
Blas María de la Garza Falcón
New Kingdom of León
Eastern Internal Provinces

References

Some historical and genealogical information on Nuevo Santander

External links
Worldstatesmen.org: Provinces of New Spain

New Spain
Colonial Mexico
Former provinces of Spain
Former states of Mexico
Mexican Texas
Tamaulipas
States and territories established in 1746
States and territories disestablished in 1821
1746 establishments in New Spain
1821 disestablishments in New Spain
1740s establishments in Mexico
1821 disestablishments in Mexico